Helmut Markwort (born 8 December 1936 in Darmstadt) is a German journalist and former editor-in-chief of the German weekly news magazine Focus from 1993 to 2010. He is a member of the Landtag of Bavaria (state parliament) for the liberal Free Democratic Party of Germany.

Markwort was nominated by his party as delegate to the Federal Convention for the purpose of electing the President of Germany in 2022.

References 

1936 births
Living people
Politicians from Darmstadt
People from the People's State of Hesse
Free Democratic Party (Germany) politicians
German journalists
German male journalists
20th-century German journalists
21st-century German journalists
German male writers
Focus (German magazine) people